Shorea johorensis (also called seraya majau or meranti majau) is a species of plant in the family Dipterocarpaceae.

Description
It is a large emergent tree growing typically to 65 m tall. The tallest measured specimen is 82.4 m tall in the Tawau Hills National Park, in Sabah on the island of Borneo. It is found in Sumatra, Peninsular Malaysia and Borneo.

Sources

johorensis
Trees of Borneo
Trees of Peninsular Malaysia
Trees of Sumatra
Critically endangered flora of Asia
Taxonomy articles created by Polbot